Arsenault-Cameron v Prince Edward Island, [2000] 1 S.C.R. 3, 2000 SCC 1, is a landmark Supreme Court of Canada decision on minority language rights. The Court found that the numbers of Francophone children in Summerside, Prince Edward Island warranted French-language education in Summerside, under section 23 of the Canadian Charter of Rights and Freedoms, and the province was constitutionally obligated to create a French language school.

Background
A number of Francophone families living in Summerside made a request to the French Language Board to build a French-language school in the community rather than bus the children to the closest French school 57 minutes away. The Board made a proposal to the Minister which was rejected.

The family applied for a declaration against the province to build a school in Summerside. At trial the declaration was granted but was overturned on appeal.

In the decision of Arsenault-Cameron v. Prince Edward Island, [1999] 3 S.C.R. 851, prior to the language rights hearing, the counsel for the government sought to have Bastarache recuse himself for reasonable apprehension of bias due to his history of championing the French language. In an application to Bastarache, he held that he was not biased to hear the case, and so did not recuse himself.

Opinion of the Court
Major and Bastarache, writing for a unanimous court, applied a purposive interpretation to section 23 of the Charter. He found that the purpose of the right is to redress past injustices and provide "an official language minority with equal access to high quality education in its own language in circumstances where community development will be enhanced."

External links
 

Canadian Charter of Rights and Freedoms case law
Supreme Court of Canada cases
2000 in Canadian case law
Linguistic rights
Minority rights case law
French-language education in Canada
Medium of instruction
Minority languages
Summerside, Prince Edward Island
Education in Prince Edward Island